Hamren (IPA: ˈhæmrən) is a hillside town and the headquarters of the West Karbi Anglong district in the Indian state of Assam.

Demographics
As of India's 2011 census, Hamren had a population of 8694. Males constituted 50.5% (4406) of the population and females 49.5% (4288). Hamren has an average literacy rate of 86%, with male literacy at 90% and female literacy at 82%. Nationally, India's average literacy rate is 74%.

Geography
Hamren is a hillside town with the Kopili river passing through it. Towards the southern border are the hills of Meghalaya and the lake of Borapani.

Education
Hamren hosts one government college, one higher secondary school and six high schools:
Church of God High School
Don Bosco High School
Girl's High School
Government Higher Secondary School
Jirsong Government High School
Presbyterian Mission School
Rishabh Junior College
RongKarbi High School
Waisong College

See also
Diphu
Bokajan

References

Cities and towns in West Karbi Anglong district